Bijbiara railway station is a railway station on the Northern Railway network in Anantnag, Jammu and Kashmir.

History

The station has been built as part of the Jammu–Baramulla line megaproject, intending to link the Kashmir Valley with Jammu Tawi and the rest of the Indian rail network.

Location
The station is located near Hassanpora in Anantnag district.

Reduced level
The station is situated at an elevation (RL) of 1594 m above mean sea level.

Division
The railway station lies in the Firozpur Cantonment division of Northern Railways.

Design
The station features Kashmiri wood architecture, with an intended ambiance of a royal court which is designed to complement the local surroundings to the station. Station signage is predominantly in Urdu and English and Hindi.

See also
 Srinagar railway station
 Anantnag railway station

Notes

References

Railway stations in Anantnag district
Kashmir
Firozpur railway division
Railway stations opened in 2008